Suzain Fatima (born 16 November 1986) is a Pakistani actress. She has acted in many television series in Pakistan and also played a leading role in the Indian television series, Parwaaz. She is known for her role as Fatima in Meri Maa and Mehru in Behnein Aisi Bhi Hoti Hain. She will made her cinematic debut with upcoming film Delhi Gate.

Career

Modeling 
She is doing modeling for many years now. From bridal to causal Still shoots she has done all of them. Suzain is yet to make her debut on Ramp. She has done many commercials as well in Pakistan such as Olpers, Dawlance, Mobilink Jazz, Askari Bank, Knorr and many others.

Acting 
She started her Professional career in 2004 and her first play was Mohabbet Hai Zindagi which was on aired on PTV Home. She has also worked in Indian television series Parwaaz which was on aired on Zee TV. She gained popularity with her portrayal of a leading role in ARY Zindagi's Behnein Aisi Bhi Hoti Hain.

Hosting 
In 2015, she hosted the season 2 of Haan Qabool Hai on ATV.

Filmography

Film
 Delhi Gate (upcoming)

Television

References

External links
Official site

1986 births
Living people